The Southern 80 is an annual water-ski race held on the Murray River in Australia, finishing at the Victorian/NSW border towns of Echuca and Moama. The race, held on the second weekend in February, currently attracts around 900 competitors and 260 boats, as well as tens of thousands of spectators. Teams of four (a boat driver, an observer and two skiers) make up the vast bulk of entries over the 39 different classes, with racing on Saturday held over a 20 km course, starting at the Five Mile boat ramp and finishing at Victoria Park in Echuca, while Sunday's racing is held over the full 80 km course, starting from Torrumbarry Weir and finishing at Victoria Park. Classes cater for different engine capacities of both inboards and outboards, as well as a range of age classes (under 10s, under 13s, under 16s, under 19s). There is also a women's and disabled class, and series of Social classes for skiers who use waterskis with the same dimensions and bindings as regular slalom skis, rather than the long "rail" waterskis used by Expert class skiers

Due to the 120-plus bends in the course., and the narrow width of the Murray River around Echuca-Moama, the race is considered to be a tough challenge for competitors, while also providing spectators on the river bank close views of the action. However, due to the short straights, boats are unable to sustain high speeds, although the top Super Class competitors are capable of hitting speeds of up 200 km/h on the longer straights

History 

The first two-up water-ski race to be held on the Murray River took place 30 & 31 October 1965, when  nine boats competed in the Echuca Ski Cup, which was held over a 100-mile (161 km) course, which took competitors from Echuca to Torrumbarry and back again. The winner of the Echuca Ski Cup was Turbofire, an inboard owned by P Reison of Harboard, NSW. Between 1967 and 1974, the Victorian Water Ski Association began running the Southern 50 race over a 50-mile (80 km) course, starting at the Victoria Park boat ramp in Echuca and finishing at the Torrumbarry Weir boat ramp, with teams of two skiers, a driver and an observer competing. In 1972, the direction of racing changed, with competitors now starting at Torrumbarry Weir boat ramp and finishing at Victoria Park boat ramp. By this stage there were 10 different classes.

In 1974, the newly formed Moama Water Sports Club took over running of the race, and the following year it was renamed the Southern 80 (in recognition of Australia's switch from imperial to metric measures) and held in February rather than May. During the 1970s, driver Lenny Retallick enjoyed multiple outright victories with his wooden Suicide boats, claiming his first overall success in 1975, then backing it up with wins in 1977 and 1978

During the early 1980s the race started to attract more than 100 entries, as well as large numbers of spectators. The dominant driver of the decade was Ted Hurley, who recorded three outright victories - first in 1982 with Rolco IV, then in 1984 with Rolco VI, and again in 1987 with Recovery. Rolco VI, which Hurley sold to Murray Price, was also victorious in the 1986 and 1988 Southern 80s, racing as Rolco.

Island Cooler became the first boat to record back-to-back Southern 80 victories since Suicide when it recorded record-breaking victories in 1989 and 1990, both times towing local waterskier Jamie Oliver. The record time set in 1990 was 34 minutes and 18 seconds, for an average speed of 140 km/h. That year, the race attracted a then-record 336 entries. God's Gift and Gotta Be Crazy were the two dominant boats of the 1990s, with the North Queensland team of Gotta Be Crazy victorious in 1993 and 1996, while the iconic God's Gift recorded two record-breaking victories in 1995 and 1998. God's Gift towed Oliver to both victories, giving him a record four outright wins for a skier at the time

Top Shot became the first boat to break the 32-minute barrier when it recorded an outright win in 2000., while Blown Budget was a popular winner in 2003, as 11 years earlier Blown Budget's skiers Steve Morley and Brett Dominguez had won the Southern 80 outright with Thundernuts. Both boats were driven by Brett's father, Michael Dominguez. The Hellbent team of driver Mark Cranny and observer Damien Matthews were dominant at the end of the decade, recording Southern 80 wins in 2005, 2006 and 2008. There was no outright winners in the 2009 Southern 80, as the race had to be abandoned on the Sunday as emergency services crews were called away to assist with the Black Saturday bushfires

Cranny and Matthews have dominated the Southern 80 in recent years, recording wins in 2010, 2011, 2012, 2013 and 2015 with Hellrazor. All five victories involved skier Peter Procter, while his teammate in four of the wins was Jason Walmsley. Walmsley also claimed outright Southern 80 victories with Stinga in 2007 and Hellbent in 2008, giving him a record six outright wins for a skier (as of 2015). Cranny holds the record for most wins by a driver with nine, while Matthews has recorded eight outright victories as an observer and one as a skier, back in 1990 with Island Cooler.

List of outright Southern 80 winners 

Race results were unavailable for most years prior to 1971.

 * In 2007, the race was shortened as part of the Murray River course was declared a crime scene, following a death that was unrelated to the race.
 ** In 2009, the race was called off before the Super Class boats took to the course, as emergency service crews were called away to assist with the Black Saturday bushfires.

References

External links 
 Southern 80 website

Skiing in Australia
Water skiing competitions
Murray River